In combinatorial mathematics and extremal set theory, the Sauer–Shelah lemma states that every family of sets with small VC dimension consists of a small number of sets. It is named after Norbert Sauer and Saharon Shelah, who published it independently of each other in 1972. The same result was also published slightly earlier and again independently, by Vladimir Vapnik and Alexey Chervonenkis, after whom the VC dimension is named.  In his paper containing the lemma, Shelah gives credit also to Micha Perles, and for this reason the lemma has also been called the Perles–Sauer–Shelah lemma.

Buzaglo et al. call this lemma "one of the most fundamental results on VC-dimension", and it has applications in many areas. Sauer's motivation was in the combinatorics of set systems, while Shelah's was in model theory and that of Vapnik and Chervonenkis was in statistics. It has also been applied in discrete geometry and graph theory.

Definitions and statement

In terms of these definitions, the Sauer–Shelah lemma states that if  is a family of sets with  distinct elements such that
, then  shatters a set of size .

The number of shattered sets
Thus, when , there are not enough small sets to be shattered, so one of the shattered sets must have cardinality at least .

For a restricted type of shattered set, called an order-shattered set, the number of shattered sets always equals the cardinality of the set family.

Proof
Pajor's variant of the Sauer–Shelah lemma may be proved by mathematical induction; the proof has variously been credited to Noga Alon or to Ron Aharoni and Ron Holzman. 

Base: every family of only one set shatters the empty set. 

Split  into two subfamilies, of the sets that contain  and the sets that do not contain . 

By the induction assumption, these two subfamilies shatter two collections of sets whose sizes add to at least . 

None of these shattered sets contain , since a set that contains  cannot be shattered by a family in which all sets contain  or all sets do not contain .

Some of the shattered sets may be shattered by both subfamilies.

A different proof of the Sauer–Shelah lemma in its original form, by Péter Frankl and János Pach, is based on linear algebra and the inclusion–exclusion principle.

Applications
The original application of the lemma, by Vapnik and Chervonenkis, was in showing that every probability distribution can be approximated (with respect to a family of events of a given VC dimension) by a finite set of sample points whose cardinality depends only on the VC dimension of the family of events. In this context, there are two important notions of approximation, both parameterized by a number ε: a set S of samples, and a probability distribution on S, is said to be an ε-approximation of the original distribution if the probability of each event with respect to S differs from its original probability by at most ε. A set S of (unweighted) samples is said to be an ε-net if every event with probability at least ε includes at least one point of S. An ε-approximation must also be an ε-net but not necessarily vice versa.

Vapnik and Chervonenkis used the lemma to show that set systems of VC dimension d always have ε-approximations of cardinality . Later authors including  and  similarly showed that there always exist ε-nets of cardinality , and more precisely of cardinality at most . The main idea of the proof of the existence of small ε-nets is to choose a random sample x of cardinality  and a second independent random sample y of cardinality , and to bound the probability that x is missed by some large event E by the probability that x is missed and simultaneously the intersection of y with E is larger than its median value. For any particular E, the probability that x is missed while y is larger than its median is very small,
and the Sauer–Shelah lemma (applied to ) shows that only a small number of distinct events E need to be considered, so by the union bound, with nonzero probability, x is an ε-net.

In turn, ε-nets and ε-approximations, and the likelihood that a random sample of large enough cardinality has these properties, have important applications in machine learning, in the area of probably approximately correct learning. In computational geometry, they have been applied to range searching, derandomization, and approximation algorithms.

 use generalizations of the Sauer–Shelah lemma to prove results in graph theory such as that the number of strong orientations of a given graph is sandwiched between its numbers of connected and 2-edge-connected subgraphs.

See also 
 Growth function

References 

Families of sets
Lemmas